Onil Christian Kouakou (born 20 April 1995) is a Swedish professional footballer who plays for IK Sirius as a striker. He is of Ivorian descent.

Career
He made his debut in Allsvenskan on 17 June 2011, when in the 88th minute he was substituted for Teteh Bangura, in an away win over Gefle IF. Kouakou became the youngest AIK player to ever feature in Allsvenskan.

During the first half of the 2012 season, he made three appearances in the first team. He was then loaned out to Akropolis IF for the rest of the season. During his stay there, he made a total of eight appearances and scored once.

On 3 April 2013, it was announced that Kouakou was joining Mjällby AIF on loan.

On 8 August 2018, after a successful stint at Nyköpings BIS, Kouakou joined IK Brage in Superettan.

Career statistics

References

External links

1995 births
Living people
People from Solna Municipality
Swedish people of Ivorian descent
Association football forwards
AIK Fotboll players
Swedish footballers
Mjällby AIF players
IF Brommapojkarna players
Nyköpings BIS players
IK Brage players
IFK Göteborg players
IK Sirius Fotboll players
Allsvenskan players
Superettan players
Ettan Fotboll players
Sweden youth international footballers
Sportspeople from Stockholm County